Darvin Furniture & Mattress is a 103-year-old American furniture and mattress retailer based in Orland Park, Illinois. Three generations of the Darvin family have owned and operated Chicago metro area's largest furniture and mattress store. Founded by Louis Darvin in 1920 and succeeded by son David Darvin, the company is still operated by grandsons Steve and Marty Darvin. Under the leadership of Darvin Furniture & Mattress President Will Harris, the retailer is ranked 71st in the Top-100 list of Furniture Retailers in the U.S.

History 

In 1920 Louis Darvin began selling furniture door-to-door in Chicago. In the 1970s, David's sons, Steve and Marty, joined the family business, and in 1980 a new facility was built in Orland Park, 25 miles south of downtown Chicago. Five expansions to the facility have been made since 1980. In 2000, Darvin opened its 218,000-square-foot distribution center in Mokena, Illinois,
In 2010, a 9,000-square-foot Mattress Gallery was added to the store. In 2014, Darvin Furniture was ranked 71st of 100 Furniture Retailers in the U.S. An additional 36,000-square-foot Clearance & Outlet Center was added to the second floor of its showroom in 2015.  Darvin launched its digital e-commerce platform in 2017, allowing users to purchase merchandise online from home or on the go. 

In 2020, Steve and Marty Darvin transitioned the company to employee ownership via an Employee Stock Ownership Plan (ESOP). This plan led to a transition of the management structure that brought Will Harris to run as the company's president. He is the first person outside the family to become the leader of Darvin Furniture. As of 2020, when the company went outside of the family for new leadership in Will Harris, the company was the largest furniture and mattress store in the Chicago area. Nonetheless, it remained uncommon among the Top 100 furniture retailers as a single store operation.

Community 
Darvin Furniture & Mattress is active in the Chicago giving community, participating with regional charities and helping with local non-profit needs. The company has participated in local fundraising, furniture donation, crisis center support, and support for autistic people.

Awards and recognition 
 Top-100 Furniture Retailer, Furniture Today Magazine – 2018
 Accredited by the Better Business Bureau (BBB) – 2018
 City of Hope Honoree
 Illinois Retail Merchants Association Retailer of the Year Award – 2016
 Orland Park Community Pride Award – 2016
 Best Furniture in Northwest Indiana, Northwest Indiana Times – 2012, 2015
 Furniture Today Leadership Award 2018
 Lifetime Achievement - Retail Giant, Furniture Today Magazine – 2021

References

External links 
 Darvin Furniture website

Retail companies established in 1920
Companies based in Illinois
Furniture retailers of the United States
1920 establishments in Illinois
American companies established in 1920